Camelon Juniors Football Club are a Scottish football club based in Camelon, in the Falkirk district. Despite this move, the club has decided to retain the "Juniors" part of its identity. The club have won the Scottish Junior Cup once, in 1995.

History
A previous Camelon side had existed in the Junior grade from 1906 to 1910, however the current club were formed in 1920. This Camelon Juniors side initially competed in Stirlingshire competitions but became the easternmost side to join the breakaway Scottish Intermediate League in 1927, ironically joining the West Division of the new set-up. The club resigned from the Intermediates halfway through the 1929–30 season and joined the Scottish Junior League which at the time, contained fellow Stirlingshire sides Dunipace and Kilsyth Rangers. Camelon remained with the SJL up to and including its solitary post-World War II season before moving in 1947 to the Edinburgh & District League.

Camelon made their first appearance in the final of the Scottish Junior Cup in 1952, losing 1–0 to Kilbirnie Ladeside at Hampden Park in front of 69,959 supporters. John Hansen, father of future Scotland internationalists Alan and John, played for the Mariners at centre-half. The club made consecutive final appearances in the 1990s, defeating Whitburn 2–0 at Fir Park, Motherwell in 1995, to lift the trophy for the first time, then losing by the same scoreline to Tayport at the same venue a year later.

The club provided several players to Rangers over the years, including Jerry Dawson and Archie Macaulay, who both went on to become full Scotland internationals with Macaulay going on to play for West Ham United and Arsenal. Max Murray also arrived at Ibrox from Camelon via Queen's Park, and scored Rangers first ever goal in European competition against OGC Nice in 1956. Notable ex-Camelon players in more recent times include former Chelsea and Falkirk winger Kevin McAllister and Jack Ross. Ross was a member of Camelon's losing 1996 Scottish Junior Cup final side and was also capped for the Scotland Junior international team.

After winning the Lothian District League Division One in 2005–06, the club played in the top tier of the East Region for twelve seasons until their move to the senior pyramid. Their best finish in the East Superleague was 2nd in 2008–09, losing to Bonnyrigg Rose on goal difference. Camelon was one of many junior clubs that moved to the senior East of Scotland Football League during 2018.

The team had been managed since October 2016 by former Dumbarton striker, Gordon Herd. The club parted with Herd and his coaching staff on 11 March 2021.

Colours

Camelon's traditional home kit is all red, with the team currently possessing an away kit of blue tops with blue shorts.

Current squad
As of 28 May 2021

Coaching Staff

Honours
Scottish Junior Cup
Winners: 1994–95
Runners-up: 1951–52, 1995–96

Other Honours
 South & East of Scotland Cup-Winners' Shield winners: 2018–19
 Alex Jack Cup winners: 2018–19
 East Region Division One winners: 1979–80, 1993–94, 1994–95
 Fife & Lothians (Heineken) Cup winners: 1970–71, 2005–06, 2014–15
 Lothian District League Division One winners: 2003–04, 2005–06
 East of Scotland Junior Cup winners: 1993–94, 2007–08
 East Junior League Cup winners: 1993–94
 Brown Cup winners: 1976–77
 St Michaels Cup winners: 2004–05

References

 
Football clubs in Scotland
Scottish Junior Football Association clubs
Football in Falkirk (council area)
Association football clubs established in 1920
1920 establishments in Scotland
East of Scotland Football League teams